Louis Marie Alphonse Depuiset (20 September 1822 Autuy, Ardennes - 17 March 1886 Paris) was a French entomologist who specialised in Lepidoptera.

He was, from 1850, an insect dealer in Paris and a close friend of Jean Baptiste Boisduval.

He wrote Catalogue méthodique des Lépidoptères d'Europe (1861) and Description d'une nouvelle espèce de Lépidoptère du g. Papilio, provenant de la Nouvelle-Guinée (1878)

French lepidopterists
1822 births
1886 deaths
People from Ardennes (department)
19th-century French zoologists